In Greek mythology, Pareia or Paria (Ancient Greek: Παρείας means 'reddish-brown snake') was a Parian nymph and concubine of King Minos of Crete. By the latter, she mothered Eurymedon, Nephalion, Chryses, and Philolaus. These men were later on slain by the hero Heracles after they killed two of his comrades.

Notes

Reference 

 Apollodorus, The Library with an English Translation by Sir James George Frazer, F.B.A., F.R.S. in 2 Volumes, Cambridge, MA, Harvard University Press; London, William Heinemann Ltd. 1921. ISBN 0-674-99135-4. Online version at the Perseus Digital Library. Greek text available from the same website.

Nymphs